CFR Title 27 – Alcohol, Tobacco Products and Firearms is one of 50 titles composing the United States Code of Federal Regulations (CFR) and contains the principal set of rules and regulations issued by federal agencies regarding alcohol, tobacco products, and firearms. It is available in digital and printed form and can be referenced online using the Electronic Code of Federal Regulations (e-CFR).

Structure 

The table of contents, as reflected in the e-CFR updated February 21, 2014, is as follows:

 27